Bayou topminnow is a common name for several fishes and may refer to:

 Fundulus nottii
 Fundulus pulvereus